The Nikkei Cup, also known as the Torakichi Nakamura Memorial tournament, was a professional golf tournament that was held in Japan from 1985 to 1998.  It was an event on the Japan Golf Tour and played at a variety of courses in Japan. It was dedicated in recognition of the achievements of Torakichi Nakamura.

Winners

Notes

References

External links
Coverage on Japan Golf Tour's official site

Former Japan Golf Tour events
Defunct golf tournaments in Japan
Recurring sporting events established in 1985
Recurring sporting events disestablished in 1998
1985 establishments in Japan
1998 disestablishments in Japan